East Stroudsburg University of Pennsylvania (ESU) is a public university in East Stroudsburg, Pennsylvania. It is one of ten state universities that compose the Pennsylvania State System of Higher Education (PASSHE).

History
What today is East Stroudsburg University of Pennsylvania was founded in 1893 as a private preparatory school for teachers and then known as the East Stroudsburg Normal School. Ownership was transferred to the Commonwealth of Pennsylvania in 1920, and the name was changed to East Stroudsburg State Normal School.  In 1927, the right to confer the degrees of Bachelor of Science in education and Bachelor of Science in health education was granted, and the school's name then became the East Stroudsburg State Teachers College. In 1960, additional curricula were added and the school's name then became East Stroudsburg State College. The State System of Higher Education was authorized by Senate Bill 506 to assume its current name in 1983.

Presidents
East Stroudsburg University of Pennsylvania has had 13 presidents since its establishment.
George P. Bible (1893–1902)
Ellwood L. Kemp (1902–1920)
Frank E. Baker (1920–1923)
Tracy T. Allen (1923–1939)
Joseph F. Noonan (1940–1955)
LeRoy J. Koehler (1956–1968)
Frank D. Sills (1968–1971)
Darrell Holmes (1971–1979)
H. Erik Shaar (1979–1980)
Dennis Bell (1980–1986)
James E. Gilbert (1986–1996)
Robert J. Dillman (1996–2012)
Marcia G. Welsh (2012–2020)
Kenneth Long (2022-present)

Campus

East Stroudsburg University is situated in the borough of East Stroudsburg, located in the Pocono Mountains of Northeastern Pennsylvania. The neighboring borough of Stroudsburg is the seat and cultural center of Monroe County. The university is accessible from Interstate 80, U.S. Route 209, and PA Route 33. Lehigh Valley Hospital-Pocono, the area's primary medical facility, is located on the edge of the campus.

In addition to the academic facilities, seven residence halls (housing 2,200 students), and a 1,000-seat dining hall are located on campus. The campus is patrolled by the East Stroudsburg University Police Department.

Buildings

In 2003, ESU opened its recreation center. This recreational facility contains an elevated indoor track, several basketball courts, racquetball rooms, various free weight and weight machines as well as cardio machines. In addition to individual programs, there are also group fitness programs ranging from the normal (step aerobics and yoga). In 2010, this building was named for Dr. Mattioli, thus becoming the "Mattioli Recreation Center".

In September 2006, ESU began construction on the new Science and Technology Center. The Science and Technology Center is the first new major academic building since 1979. The $40,000,000 building houses chemistry, math, computer science, and other various science departments. With , the building includes research and classroom space, planetarium, heated celestial observation room, as well as offices for the relocated departments. The building officially opened on September 26, 2008.

Academics
East Stroudsburg University of Pennsylvania offers 68 undergraduate major programs with 24 available concentrations, the largest of which (by enrollment) are Health and Physical Education K-12, Elementary Education, Biological Sciences, Business Management, Computer Science, Psychology, and Secondary Education. ESU has majors in Health Services Administration and Industrial Physics as well as graduate study programs. ESU's extended learning program offers professional development training in Building Information Modeling (BIM). The current student-to-professor ratio stands at 19:1. The breakdown of traditional students consists of 56% female, 44% male, 24% out of state, and 1% international from 9 different countries.

Student life

Campus media
The student-run Calliope literary magazine publishes student fiction, poetry, creative non-fiction, art and photography, and electronic creative writing. Calliope appears both in print and online editions annually under the auspices of the Department of English. Founded in 1927, the student-run Stroud Courier student newspaper publishes news, feature stories, and opinions weekly on Thursdays. It appears in print and online and is advised by the Department of English. Radio FM 90.3 WESS is a student operated, non-commercial, FCC-licensed radio station located on the campus of ESU. It has a diversified music format offering music and talk shows and broadcasts of Warriors' home football and basketball games.

Greek life

Fraternities
Kappa Alpha Psi
Delta Chi
Sigma Pi
Theta Chi
Kappa Delta Rho
Phi Beta Sigma
Omega Psi Phi

Sororities
Alpha Omicron Pi
Alpha Sigma Tau
Sigma Sigma Sigma
Mu Sigma Upsilon
Chi Upsilon Sigma
Zeta Phi Beta
Lambda Iota

Athletics

East Stroudsburg University of Pennsylvania's colors are red and black, and the team nickname is the Warriors. For the 2008–09 academic year, the university's mascot was changed to Burgy the warrior bear. In 2017 a new mascot was unveiled, that of an ancient warrior. All teams compete in the NCAA Division II and within the Pennsylvania State Athletic Conference (PSAC). Athletic Training services are provided for each intercollegiate sport. There are currently seven male varsity sports available (Baseball, Basketball, Cross Country, Football, Soccer, Track & Field and Wrestling) as well as 11 female varsity sports (Basketball, Cross Country, Field Hockey, Golf, Lacrosse, Soccer, Softball, Swimming, Tennis, Track & Field and Volleyball).

Notable alumni
 Joseph Battisto, former Pennsylvania State Representative
 Charlie Brenneman, former professional UFC mixed martial arts fighter
 Rudy Cerami, former professional football player
 Jim Connors, former Mayor of Scranton
 Edwin Erickson, former Pennsylvania State Senator
 Vic Fangio, defensive football coach, Philadelphia Eagles
 Pat Flaherty, offensive college football line coach, Rutgers
 James Franklin, head college football coach, Penn State
 Eric Frein, domestic terrorist and murderer behind 2014 Pennsylvania State Police barracks attack
 Patricia McMahon Hawkins, former U.S. ambassador to Togo
 Mervin Heller Jr., former United States Tennis Association president
 Harry Hiestand, college football offensive line coach, Notre Dame
 Duane Johnson, professional basketball player, Israeli National League
 Ruth Kramer, former All-American Girls Professional Baseball League player
 Marie Kruckel, former All-American Girls Professional Baseball League player
 Jim Lambert, sportswriter
 Dale H. Learn, 1948 vice-president nominee of the Prohibition Party
 Bill Lewis, former college football coach
 Kelly Lewis, former Pennsylvania State Representative
 Sally McNeil, former amateur bodybuilder, erotic wrestler, and murderer
 Ralph Mitterling, former professional baseball player, Philadelphia Athletics
 Jane Moffet, former All-American Girls Professional Baseball League player
 Anibál Nieves, former Olympic wrestler for Puerto Rico
 Ken Parrish, former professional football player
 Mike Reichenbach, professional football player, Miami Dolphins and Philadelphia Eagles
 Matt Riddle, mixed martial artist and professional wrestler
 Bob Rigby, former professional soccer player
 Jim Saxton, U.S. Congressman
 Frantz St. Lot, former professional soccer player
 Bob Stetler, former professional soccer player
 Thomas Tigue, former Pennsylvania State Representative
 Laura Van Gilder, former professional cyclist
 Jordan White, rock musician
 Ruth Williams, former All-American Girls Professional Baseball League player

References

External links

ESU Athletics website
The Stroud Courier (ESU's student newspaper) website

 

 
Educational institutions established in 1893
Eastern Pennsylvania Rugby Union
Pocono Mountains
Universities and colleges in Monroe County, Pennsylvania
1893 establishments in Pennsylvania
Public universities and colleges in Pennsylvania